Sisu is an American indie rock band from Los Angeles, founded in 2009 by Sandra Vu. The band consists of Vu (vocals, guitar, flute), Ryan Wood (bass, synth), David South (bass), Julianna Medeiros (keyboards, backing vocals) and Nathanael Keefer (drums).

Sisu employs traditional and electronic instruments, and their sound has been categorized as psychedelic pop, electronic and shoegaze. 

Following the self-released 2009 Demon Tapes EP and 2010 single "Sharp Teeth", Sisu released the Blood Tears studio album and Light Eyes EP, both in 2013 on the Mono Prism label.

Discography

Studio albums 
 Blood Tears (2013, Mono Prism)

Singles and EPs 
 Demon Tapes EP (2009, self-released)
 "Sharp Teeth" single (2010, Hell, Yes! Records)
 "Light Eyes" EP (2013, Mono Prism)

Videos 
  "Two Thousand Hands" (2013) by David South
  "Harpoons" (2013) by Howard Duy Vu

References

External links 
 SISU
 Mono Prism

Musical groups established in 2012
Indie pop groups from Los Angeles
Dream pop musical groups
Indie rock musical groups from California
2012 establishments in California